{{Infobox College Soccer Team
|name = UMass Lowell River Hawksmen's soccer
|current = 
|logo = UMass Lowell Athletics wordmark.png
|logo_size = 
|university = University of Massachusetts Lowell
|conference = America East Conference
|conference_short = America East
|founded = 1976
|division = 
|city = Lowell
|stateabb = MA
|state = Massachusetts
|coach =  Kyle Zenoni
|tenure = 1st
|stadium = Cushing Field Complex
|capacity = 800
|nickname = Hawks

| pattern_la1 = _redborder
| pattern_b1  = _lightbluehalf
| pattern_ra1 = _redborder
| pattern_sh1 = 
| pattern_so1 = 
| leftarm1    = 0048B6
| body1       =  0048B6
| rightarm1   = 0048B6
| shorts1     = 0048B6
| socks1      = 0048B6

| pattern_la2 = _blueborder
| pattern_b2  = _bluecollar
| pattern_ra2 = _blueborder
| pattern_sh2 = 
| pattern_so2 = 
| leftarm2    = ffffff
| body2       = ffffff
| rightarm2   = ffffff
| shorts2     = ffffff
| socks2      = ffffff

|NCAAchampion = 
|NCAArunnerup = 
|NCAAcollegecup = 
|NCAAeliteeight = D-II2003, 2008
|NCAAsweetsixteen = D-II2003, 2008
|NCAAroundof32 = D-II2003, 2008, 2012
|NCAAtourneys =  D-II2003, 2004, 2007, 2008, 2012
|conference_tournament = D-II Northeast 102003, 2004
|conference_season = D-II Northeast 102008

D-I America East2016''
}}

The UMass Lowell River Hawks men's soccer''' program represents University of Massachusetts Lowell in all NCAA Division I men's college soccer competitions. The River Hawks compete in the America East Conference. The program began in 1976.

History
The River Hawks spent most of their history playing in NCAA Division II before transitioning to Division I in the early 2010s. The program achieved national success in 2016, when in their final year of transition, were ranked as high as 13th in the nation. The River Hawks were ineligible to participate in the America East Conference Men's Soccer Tournament or the NCAA Division I Men's Soccer Championship due to transitioning from Division II to I. In the River Hawks first year of eligibility, they reached the final of the tournament, but lost to Albany in Double Overtime.

The River Hawks are presently coached by Christian Figueroa, a former River Hawk player. Fiugeroa guided the program to their first Division I regular season championship, which came in 2016.

Seasons 

Below is UMass Lowell's records since 2000.

Source:

References

External links 
 

 
Soccer clubs in Massachusetts
1976 establishments in Massachusetts